Munro v National Capital Commission, [1966] S.C.R. 663 is a leading Supreme Court of Canada decision on the federal peace, order, and good government power, where the Court held that the zoning, expropriation and renovation of land within the National Capital Region, in the vicinity of Ottawa, is a matter under the authority of the federal government.

Typically, matters of city improvement, zoning and bylaws are in the exclusive power of the provincial government under the property and civil rights power of the Constitution Act, 1867. However, the unique nature of the City of Ottawa in relation to the federal government was the basis of giving authority to the federal government. The interpretation of the "national concern" branch of the peace, order, and good government clause is a significantly broad one.

The National Capital Commission, a federal body, sought approval from the Governor General to expropriate land for the creation of a green belt around Ottawa. The proposal was challenged as being beyond the power of the NCC.

A unanimous Court held that the NCC plan falls within the "national concern test" of the peace, order, and good government clause. To reach this conclusion the Court examined the pith and substance of the empowering legislation and found that the law was in relation to establishing the national capital region “in order that the nature and character of the seat of the Government of Canada may be in accordance with its national significance.” The Court then allocated the matter to a Constitutional head of power but found that it did not come within either section 92 (the provincial head of power) or section 91(1) (the federal head of power). Instead the Court held that it fell within Section 91 and the "national concern" branch of POGG as it deals with a “single matter of national interest” as in Ontario (AG) v Canada Temperance Federation.

See also
 List of Supreme Court of Canada cases

Canadian federalism case law
Supreme Court of Canada cases
Supreme Court of Canada case articles without infoboxes
1966 in Canadian case law